Lapidar Lladrovci (born 15 December 1990) is a Kosovar professional footballer who plays for KF Feronikeli.

Club career
In January 2015, Lladrovci went to a trial with Albanian Superliga club Tirana which he successfully passed and signed a pre-contract, but was sent on loan at his previous club Feronikeli until the end of the season.

On 1 February 2016, Lladrovci joined fellow Albanian Superliga side as a free transfer.

International career
Lladrovci made his international debut for Kosovo on 12 January 2020 in a friendly match against Sweden, which finished as a 0–1 loss.

Personal life
He is the son of the current Kosovar ambassador to Albania Ramiz Lladrovci.

References

External links
Lapidar Lladrovci at the FSHF

1990 births
Living people
People from Drenas
Kosovan footballers
Association football defenders
KF Drenica players
KF Feronikeli players
KF Tirana players
FK Kukësi players
KF Trepça'89 players
Football Superleague of Kosovo players
Kategoria Superiore players
Kosovan expatriate sportspeople in Azerbaijan
Expatriate footballers in Albania
Kosovan expatriate sportspeople in Albania
Kosovo international footballers